Occupation of Iraq or Iraq occupation may refer to:

 Occupation of Iraq (2003–2011) (occupation by American, British and Italian forces)
 Mandatory Iraq (Iraq under British Administration, 1921–1932)
 Northern Iraq offensive (June 2014)